Oshiyan (also Romanized as Oshīyān and Oshīyān) is a village in Ashiyan Rural District, in the Central District of Lenjan County, Isfahan Province, Iran. At the 2006 census, its population was 1,091, in 267 families.

References 

Populated places in Lenjan County